Spectrum Cloudbase, often shortened to Cloudbase, is the fictional skyborne headquarters of the international security organisation Spectrum from Gerry Anderson's science-fiction television series Captain Scarlet and the Mysterons (1967–68). In the 2005 computer-animated remake, Cloudbase is re-imagined as Skybase.

In both series, the base's design is that of an airborne aircraft carrier, stationed in either Earth's high troposphere (in the original series) or low stratosphere (in the remake).

Background
While developing the series in 1966, Gerry Anderson remembered that during the Battle of Britain the RAF had found it difficult to counter the Luftwaffe due to the delays caused by having to launch fighters from the ground. In his biography, he recalled that "it took [the Spitfire squadron] about 20 minutes to climb high enough to intercept the bombers that were already at 16,000 feet." It was for this reason that Anderson decided to make Spectrum's headquarters a hovering airborne aircraft carrier: "This could launch aircraft that would then climb to 100,000 feet and intercept extraterrestrial invaders within minutes." In a separate interview, he noted that Captain Scarlet was made during the Cold War, "when world leaders held conferences on aircraft carriers, and bomber pilots were constantly in the air waiting for attack orders. So I was thinking along the lines of a wartime setting, and had the idea for Cloudbase, a giant flying aircraft carrier, and the Angels, fighter pilots ready for take-off at any time.

The Andersons' original script for the first episode stated that the base is kept airborne by "powerful jet engines that are pointing downwards and are obviously powered by atomic energy".

According to Meddings, it was the easiest Captain Scarlet vehicle to build. The base's wide-angle establishing shot, repeatedly re-used as stock footage, was filmed against a sky backdrop consisting of a background painting, cotton wool clouds and dry ice effects. Too heavy to be hung on wires, the model was held in place on the end of a horizontal metal pole. Larger-scale sections of the flight deck were built for scenes showing aircraft taking off and landing.

The puppet-size control room set incorporated green Perspex arches and a  electrically-driven moving walkway from which the character Lieutenant Green operates the base's main computer.

Specifications
Though usually geostationary, it is equipped with horizontal jet thrusters that enable it to be moved to any point above the Earth's surface. It was constructed in Earth orbit and has a crew of approximately 600. The whole structure is pressurised; pilots entering or exiting aircraft on the flight deck do so via airtight shafts and docking ports.

Cloudbase's main defence is its squadron of three Angel Interceptor fighter aircraft, flown by five female pilots. One fighter is crewed around the clock, with the others on continuous standby. Auxiliary aircraft include Spectrum Passenger Jets and Magnacopters, which are launched from a separate part of the flight deck.

Areas aboard Cloudbase include:

The Control Room, containing Colonel White's desk and Lieutenant Green's computer, which is used to operate the base's public address and other systems
The Amber Room, the standby post for the Angel pilots
The Spectrum Information Centre, containing "seventh-generation" supercomputers
The Observation Room, containing atmospheric and space-monitoring equipment
The Room of Sleep, where hypnosis and gimbal-mounted beds minimise the time required for personnel to rest
The Sick Bay, staffed by chief medical officer Dr Fawn
The Conference Room, Generator Room, Radar Room and Lounge

Skybase
In the computer-animated remake series Gerry Anderson's New Captain Scarlet (2005), Cloudbase is re-imagined as Skybase. Robotic deckhands are stationed on Skybase's flight deck to assist in the take-off and landing of aircraft. Skybase is protected by a fleet of Falcon Interceptors (updated Angel aircraft) and, in addition to the facilities featured previously, is now also equipped with squash courts.

The CGI Skybase was created using LightWave 3D software under the supervision of Ron Thornton, co-founder of animation studio Foundation Imaging (whose commissions included the Star Trek TV series and films). The computer model – which at three million polygons (described by Thornton as "way over the top"), was originally three times the size of the Enterprise NX-01 created for Star Trek: Enterprise – was too large to be rendered in one step.

Reception
Commentator Ian Fryer praises the Cloudbase interior sets designed by Keith Wilson, describing them as "both stylish and highly detailed with ground-breaking use of see-through coloured Perspex".

Cloudbase has also been viewed as part of a supposed religious allegory in the series. Commentators have suggested that the base can be interpreted as Heaven, with Colonel White serving as a God analogue and the resurrected Captain Scarlet representing the Son of God; the Devil is symbolised by either Captain Black or the Mysterons. Both Robin Turner of Wales Online and Chris Jenkins of Total DVD magazine compare White to God seated in his "heavenly Cloudbase" (defended by a fighter squadron that happens to be codenamed "the Angels"). Anderson denied that any of this symbolism was intentional.

In 1993, toy company Vivid Imaginations released a Cloudbase playset. The Toy Retailers Association later ranked it among the top 50 toys for 2001. A secret project in the expansion pack for the 1999 video game Sid Meier's Alpha Centauri is titled Cloudbase Academy.

The Valiant, an airborne aircraft carrier seen in the Doctor Who universe, has been compared to Cloudbase. Also similar are the S.H.I.E.L.D. Helicarrier from the Marvel Universe and the mobile airstrip from the 2004 science-fiction film Sky Captain and the World of Tomorrow.

References

Works cited

External links
Spectrum Headquarters: Cloudbase

Captain Scarlet (franchise)
Fictional aircraft carriers
Fictional airships
Fictional elements introduced in 1967